Oleksiy Volodymyrovych Dovhyi (born 2 November 1989) is a Ukrainian professional footballer who plays as a defensive midfielder for Rukh Lviv.

Club career
He is product of Dynamo Kyiv academy.

He spent time with different Ukrainian teams that play in the Ukrainian First League and was promoted to the Ukrainian Premier League together with Oleksandriya in 2011.

References

External links

 
 

1989 births
Living people
Footballers from Kyiv
Ukrainian footballers
Ukraine youth international footballers
Association football midfielders
FC Dynamo Kyiv players
FC Dynamo-2 Kyiv players
FC CSKA Kyiv players
FC Volyn Lutsk players
FC Oleksandriya players
FC Mariupol players
FC Metalist Kharkiv players
FC Vorskla Poltava players
FC Stal Kamianske players
FC Lviv players
FC Rukh Lviv players
Ukrainian Premier League players
Ukrainian First League players